Robert J. Martin (born January 13, 1947) is an American Republican Party politician, who served as a member of the New Jersey State Senate from 1993 to 2008, where he represented the 26th legislative district.

Before entering the Senate, Martin served in the United States Army as a First Lieutenant (1969–1971). Martin served in the New Jersey General Assembly, the lower house of the New Jersey Legislature, from 1985 to 1993, where he served as Minority Whip (1990–1992) and Assistant Majority Leader (1986–1988). He was also a member of the Morris Plains Council from 1983 to 1985, and the Morris Plains Planning Board from 1980 to 1982.

Martin replaced Dean Gallo in a special Assembly election following Gallo's election to Congress.

Senator Martin was the Assistant Majority Leader from 1994 to 1997, and served on the Education Committee, the Judiciary Committee and the Joint Committee on the Public Schools. Martin is also a Law Professor and former associate dean at Seton Hall University School of Law and has served as director of the Center for State and Local Government Law at Seton Hall University.

In September 2005, Martin said he would not seek re-election to his seat in 2007, saying that he was finished after over 20 years of public service.

Martin received a B.A. from Dickinson College in History, an M.A. from Lehigh University in History, a J.D. from the Seton Hall University School of Law, an L.L.M. from New York University School of Law and an Ed.D. from Teachers College at Columbia University. Martin is a resident of Morris Plains, New Jersey.

Martin currently serves as Counsel on the Zoning Board of Adjustment in Pompton Lakes, NJ.

District 26
Each of the forty districts in the New Jersey Legislature has one representative in the New Jersey Senate and two members in the New Jersey General Assembly. The other representatives from the 26th Legislative District for the 2007-2008 Legislative Session were:
Assemblyman Alex DeCroce, and
Assemblyman Joseph Pennacchio

References

External links
New Jersey Voter Information Website 2003
Senator Robert J. 'Bob' Martin, Project Vote Smart
New Jersey Legislature financial disclosure forms
2006 2005 2004

1947 births
Living people
United States Army officers
Lehigh University alumni
Republican Party New Jersey state senators
Republican Party members of the New Jersey General Assembly
People from Morris Plains, New Jersey
Politicians from Morris County, New Jersey
New York University School of Law alumni
Teachers College, Columbia University alumni
Dickinson College alumni
Seton Hall University School of Law alumni
Seton Hall University School of Law faculty
Military personnel from New Jersey